A bench memorandum (pl. bench memoranda) (also known as a bench memo) is a short and neutral memorandum that summarizes the facts, issues, and arguments of a court case. Bench memos are used by the judge as a reference during preparation for trial, the hearing of lawyers' arguments, and the drafting of a decision and also to give the judge an idea of the arguments given by each side in the court case. Bench memos are generally written by the judge's law clerk.

References 

Law of the United States
Legal documents
Law clerks